Sravana may refer to:

 Shravana, a Hindu nakshatra as used in Hindu astronomy
 Shraavana, the fifth month of the Hindu calendar
 Sravana Bhargavi (born 1989), South Indian playback singer